Guarulhos-CECAP is a train station on CPTM Line 13-Jade, located in the district of Cecap in Guarulhos. It is located by the Km 3 of Rodovia Hélio Smidt, next to Parque Cecap. It has connection with Guarulhos Road Terminal.

Characteristics
Elevated station with connection mezzanine in the lower level and island platform in the upper level, structure of the station in apparent concrete, and structure of the cover in metallic alloys. The main access in through a catwalk with connects the station to the Guarulhos Road Terminal and EMTU Metropolitan Corridor. It has capacity for 70,000 passengers per day.

References

Companhia Paulista de Trens Metropolitanos stations
Railway stations opened in 2018